Aaya Vada Sutta Kadhai is a 2015 Indian Tamil-language crime comedy film directed by N Phanindra starring Avitej, Suparna, Manoharan, Sai Prashanth and Mani.

Cast 
Avitej as Mani
Suparna as Renu
Manoharan K. as Duraipandi
Sai Prashanth as a gangster
Mani as Kumar

Production 
The film's title is an adaptation of the short story of the same name and is about a grandmother living in a flat. Bengali actress Supurna makes her Tamil debut with this film. Avitej and Supurna previously worked on a Telugu film prior to this film. The whole film was shot in a flat in Ambattur.

Release and reception 
The film released with seven other Tamil films.

M. Suganth of The Times of India said that "Characters are double crossed, morals are forgotten and confusion reigns but the film doesn’t find the screwball tone that is required for this material". On the contrary, Malini Mannath of The New Indian Express opined that "The twist towards the end is appreciable. For  about 113 minutes of viewing time, the film is a pleasant watch". A critic from nett4vu said that "Comedy and the background score strengthen the film. For a different kind of comedy thriller experience, Aaya Vada Sutta Kadhai can be watched once".

References 

2010s Tamil-language films
2015 films